The Do Saco River, also known as the Da Lapa River, is a river of Rio de Janeiro state in southeastern Brazil. It flows into Mangaratiba Bay, west of Rio de Janeiro city.

See also
List of rivers of Rio de Janeiro

References
Brazilian Ministry of Transport

Rivers of Rio de Janeiro (state)